USS Stribling (DD-96) was a  in the United States Navy during World War I and the years following. She was the first ship named in honor of Cornelius Stribling.

Construction and commissioning
Stribling was laid down at Quincy, Massachusetts, on 14 December 1917 by the Fore River Shipbuilding Company. The ship was launched on 29 May 1918, sponsored by Miss Mary Calvert Stribling. The destroyer was commissioned at the Boston Navy Yard on 16 August 1918.

Service history
On 31 August 1918, Stribling departed New York to escort a convoy across the Atlantic Ocean. However, machinery trouble forced her back into New York the following day. After almost three weeks in port, she got underway again on 18 September 1918, this time as an escort to a Gibraltar-bound convoy. She fueled at Ponta Delgada in the Azores and made Gibraltar in early October 1918. From there, she sailed with a convoy for Marseilles on 10 October 1918. For the next month, she made several Gibraltar-to-Marseilles circuits with Allied convoys.

After the Armistice of 11 November 1918 that ended World War I, Stribling steamed to Venice, Italy, to investigate post-armistice conditions there and at various other ports on Italy's Adriatic coast and in Dalmatia. At the completion of that duty, she headed back to the United States, arriving home in July 1919. Stribling entered the Portsmouth Navy Yard for overhaul and repairs before being placed in reduced commission at Philadelphia. There, she was converted to a light minelayer and, on 17 July 1920, she was redesignated DM-1.

In September 1921, she departed Philadelphia and teamed to the United States West Coast and, from there, proceeded on to Pearl Harbor, Hawaii. After a series of maneuvers in the Hawaiian Islands, Stribling was decommissioned on 26 June 1922. On 1 December 1936, her name was struck from the Navy list. The following month, her hulk was towed to San Pedro, California, where she was sunk as a target in January 1937.

References

External links
 NavSource Photos
 USS Stribling in Glenn Mills World War I Photograph Album, Iowa Women's Archives Repository, Iowa Digital Library

 

Stribling (DD-96)
World War I destroyers of the United States
Maritime incidents in 1937
Ships sunk as targets
Shipwrecks of the California coast
Ships built in Quincy, Massachusetts
1918 ships